Hiram C. Ebright (June 12, 1859 – October 24, 1916) was an American baseball player. He played in 16 games for the   Washington Nationals of the National League, hitting .254 in 59 at-bats. He played catcher, outfield and shortstop. He also played minor league baseball in the California League from 1888 to 1893 and the Western Association from 1894 to 1898. He finished his career with the Sioux City Cornhuskers of the Western League in 1900. He was a player/manager from 1894 to 1897 in minor league baseball as well.

External links

1859 births
1916 deaths
Major League Baseball shortstops
Major League Baseball outfielders
Major League Baseball catchers
Washington Nationals (1886–1889) players
Baseball players from Pennsylvania
People from Lancaster County, Pennsylvania
19th-century baseball players
Hastings Hustlers players
San Francisco Haverlys players
Oakland Colonels players
San Jose Dukes players
San Francisco Friscos players
Lincoln Treeplanters players
Cedar Rapids Bunnies players
Peoria Blackbirds players
Reading Coal Heavers players
St. Joseph Saints players
Sioux City Cornhuskers players
Minor league baseball managers
Burials in Wisconsin